KAGH-FM (104.9 FM, "Today's Country 104.9") is a radio station licensed to serve Crossett, Arkansas, United States. The station is owned by Crossett Radio and licensed to Peggy S. Medlin's Ashley County Broadcasters, Inc.

The station airs a country music format. In addition to its usual music programming, KAGH-FM also airs St. Louis Cardinals baseball games and Arkansas Razorbacks football games.

The station was assigned the KAGH-FM call letters by the Federal Communications Commission on March 16, 1967 according to the Northwest Arkansas Times.

References

External links
KAGH-FM official website
Crossett Radio

AGH-FM
Country radio stations in the United States
Ashley County, Arkansas
Radio stations established in 1979
1979 establishments in Arkansas